Canale  may refer to:

Places
Italy
 Canale, Piedmont, a comune in the Province of Cuneo
 Canale, Trentino-Alto Adige/Südtirol, a frazione in the Province of Trento
 Canale d'Agordo, a comune in the Province of Belluno, Veneto
 Canale Monterano, a comune in the Province of Rome, Lazio

People
 Canale (surname), an Italian surname